Ernest C. Joy (January 20, 1878 – February 12, 1924) was an American stage and film actor of the silent era. He appeared in 76 films between 1911 and 1920.

Selected filmography

 Article 47, L' (1913)
 Salomy Jane (1914)
 Mignon (1915)
 The Goose Girl (1915)
 After Five (1915)
 The Woman (1915)
 The Wild Goose Chase (1915)
 Chimmie Fadden (1915)
 The Voice in the Fog (1915)
 Chimmie Fadden Out West (1915)
 Temptation (1915)
 The Golden Chance (1915)
 The Heart of Nora Flynn (1916)
 Maria Rosa (1916)
 The Clown (1916)
 The Heir to the Hoorah (1916)
 Joan the Woman (1916)
 The Silent Partner (1917)
 The Inner Shrine (1917)
 Nan of Music Mountain (1917)
 Rimrock Jones (1918)
 The House of Silence (1918)
 Believe Me, Xantippe (1918)
 We Can't Have Everything (1918)
 The Goat (1918)
 The Dancin' Fool (1920)
 A Lady in Love (1920)
 What's Your Hurry? (1920)
 The Notorious Miss Lisle (1920)

References

External links

1878 births
1924 deaths
American male film actors
American male silent film actors
20th-century American male actors
Male actors from Iowa